La dueña (The owner (female) or The Chairwoman) may refer to:

 La dueña (Venezuelan TV series), 1984
 La dueña (Argentine TV series), 2012
 La dueña (1966 Mexican TV series), a Mexican telenovela
 La Dueña (1995 Mexican TV series), a Mexican telenovela